Schluter is a surname. Notable people with the surname include:

 Albert Schluter (1923–2007), German born Australian activist for immigrant rights in Australia
 Ariane Schluter (born 1966), Dutch film actress
 Dolph Schluter (born 1955), evolutionary biologist
 John Schluter (born 1955), Australian weekday weather presenter
 Michael Schluter (economist) (born 1947), economist, author, speaker and social entrepreneur
 William E. Schluter (born 1927), New Jersey politician

See also
 Schlüter